The New Zealand national cricket team toured Sri Lanka from 30 October 2012 to 29 November 2012. The tour consisted of two Test matches, five One Day Internationals and one Twenty20 International matches. Sri Lanka Cricket moved the second and third ODIs against New Zealand from the R. Premadasa Stadium in Colombo to the Pallekele Cricket Stadium, because the Premadasa was flooded after three weeks of monsoon rain.

Squads

Venues 
All matches were played at the following four grounds:

Twenty20 Series

Only T20I

ODI series

1st ODI

2nd ODI 

 Colombo ODIs moved to Pallekele

3rd ODI 

 Colombo ODIs moved to Pallekele

4th ODI

5th ODI

Test series

1st Test

2nd Test

References 

2012 in New Zealand cricket
2012 in Sri Lankan cricket
International cricket competitions in 2012–13
2012-13
Sri Lankan cricket seasons from 2000–01